Francisco Guterres, popularly known as Lú-Olo (born 7 September 1954), is an East Timorese politician who served as president of East Timor from 20 May 2017 to 20 May 2022. He is also the president of the political party Fretilin, and he was the first president of the National Parliament of East Timor from 2002 to 2007. 

As the Fretilin candidate, he stood in the 2007 presidential election and 2012 presidential election, but was defeated in the second round by independent candidates on both occasions. He also contested the 2017 presidential election, and with the support of former prime minister Xanana Gusmão and the CNRT, was elected the 6th president of East Timor. Guterres ran for re-election in 2022, but was defeated in a landslide in the second round by Ramos-Horta. 

He is considered a centre-left politician.

Early life
Born in Ossu in 1954, Guterres has described himself as “the son of a poor family, of humble people”. He is a Roman Catholic and a former guerrilla fighter.

Political career
At an extraordinary conference of Fretilin in Sydney, Australia in 1998, Guterres was named general coordinator of the Council of Armed Resistance. In July 2001, he was elected president of Fretilin. Guterres was elected to the Constituent Assembly in the August 2001 parliamentary election, and he was subsequently elected by the Constituent Assembly as its president; when East Timor gained its independence in May 2002, the Constituent Assembly was transformed into the National Parliament, with Guterres as its president.

In the 2007 presidential election, Guterres ran as Fretilin's candidate and campaigned on a populist platform. However, some members of Fretilin blamed him for the 2006 East Timorese crisis and instead supported Prime Minister José Ramos-Horta, who was running as an independent candidate. In the first round of the election, held on 9 April, Guterres took first place with 27.89% of the vote. He and Ramos-Horta participated in the second round in May, and Guterres lost with 31% of the vote against 69% for Ramos-Horta. He accepted the result and congratulated Ramos-Horta.

Guterres was re-elected to parliament in the June 2007 parliamentary election as the first name on Fretilin's candidate list. 

Guterres ran for President a second time in the 2012 presidential election as Fretilin's candidate. he won a plurality of votes in the first round, but was defeated in the second round by Taur Matan Ruak.

In the 2017 presidential election, Guterres ran again as the Fretilin candidate, with the support of former prime minister Xanana Gusmão and his party, National Congress for Timorese Reconstruction (CNRT). Early results indicated that he won more than 50% of votes in the first round. Guterres took office on 20 May 2017 as the first elected partisan president of East Timor. In 2020, Guterres planned to resign and former president Xanana Gusmão would take office, however, he reversed his decision to tackle the Coronavirus Pandemic. Guterres started a coronavirus vaccination campaign in the summer of 2021, addressing the importance of the vaccine. Within the year preceding the campaign, multiple mask mandates were set. He has generally received praise for his handling of the pandemic, with the number of COVID cases in the country significantly dropping after the campaign was launched. 

Guterres ran for re-election in 2022, but was defeated in a landslide in the second round by Ramos-Horta. Ramos-Horta was sworn in as president of East Timor in a peaceful transfer of power on 20 May 2022; the 20th independence anniversary of East Timor.

References

External links
 East Timor: Birth of a Nation: Lu Olo's Story

|-

|-

|-

|-

1955 births
East Timorese Roman Catholics
Living people
Makasae people
Fretilin politicians
People from Viqueque District
Presidents of East Timor
Presidents of the National Parliament (East Timor)
East Timorese military personnel